Mengistu Worku (Amharic: መንግስቱ ወርቁ; 1940 – 16 December 2010) was an Ethiopian footballer, recognised as one of the best Ethiopian footballers in history with Luciano Vassalo and Yidnekatchew Tessema. He is best known for his role in the final of the 1962 African Nations Cup, and for being the head coach to take the Ethiopia national team to the African Nations Cup in Libya in 1982.

Career
During the 1962 African Nationals Cup, Mengistu scored one goal in the final of the 3rd African cup against Egypt, when Ethiopia won their only major trophy to date.  Ethiopia finished as top scorer of that tournament with four goals on the final day.  He debuted with Saint-George SA in 1957 and remained with the club for the entirety of his career. Mengistu was given numerous offers to play professionally for teams in Italy's Serie A and France, as well as Egypt's El Zamalek, but like earlier legend and coach Ydnekatchew, he refused all offers and stayed in Ethiopia wearing Saint George's characteristic "V" across his chest. Mengistu wore the number 8 for the entirety of his club and national team career.  His international career began in 1958 and ended in 1970, following disappointment in the 7th African Nations cup in Sudan, where Ethiopia finished bottom of their group. He still managed to score three goals, the only Ethiopian goals in that tournament. Mengistu played two more years with Saint George, retiring in 1972. He is the seventh-highest scorer in the history of the African Cup of Nations with ten goals.

Mengistu coached the national team after retirement, but the team failed to match the success it found during his playing days. He did, however, coach the country to their first-ever CECAFA cup title in 1987, when the tournament was hosted by Ethiopia.

In 2001, Mengistu was struck by a tumor, and doctors had told him he had only months to live. With treatment unavailable in Ethiopia, the Ethiopian billionaire Mohammed Al Amoudi paid for Mengistu to travel to South Africa for treatment. "It was because of Al Amoudi that I am standing before you today," he said on Ethiopian television.

At the 2002 CECAFA Cup, Mengistu was honored before the tournament kickoff by the Council for East and Central Africa Football Association, along with five other east African footballers and three referees, including Tesfaye Gebreyesus, the Ethiopian who refereed at three ACN tournaments.

Career statistics

International goals

Scores and results list Ethiopia's goal tally first, score column indicates score after each Worku goal.

Honors

Individual
African Cup of Nations Top Scorer: 1962 (shared with Badawi Abdel Fattah)

Sources 

 RSSSF entry
 Egypt vs. Ethiopia

External links 

Saint George S.C. players
1940 births
2010 deaths
Sportspeople from Addis Ababa
Ethiopian footballers
Association football forwards
Ethiopia international footballers
Ethiopia national football team managers
1959 African Cup of Nations players
1962 African Cup of Nations players
1963 African Cup of Nations players
1968 African Cup of Nations players
1970 African Cup of Nations players
Ethiopian football managers
Africa Cup of Nations-winning players
1982 African Cup of Nations managers